Hervé Mirouze (10 December 1924 – 17 July 1998) was a French football player and coach.

He spent all his playing career as a defender at his local club, SO Montpellier, AS Cannes and Olympique Alès. In 1955, Mirouze became the coach of the Montpelliérain club. He also coached SC Toulon.

Honours

Coach
Montpellier
 French Division 2: 1960–61

References

1924 births
1998 deaths
French footballers
Association football defenders
Montpellier HSC players
AS Cannes players
Olympique Alès players
French football managers
Montpellier HSC managers
SC Toulon managers